There have been four baronetcies created for people with the surname Innes, three in the Baronetage of Nova Scotia and one in the Baronetage of the United Kingdom. Three of the creations are extant as of 2010.

The Innes, later Innes-Ker Baronetcy, of Innes in the County of Elgin, was created in the Baronetage of Nova Scotia on 28 May 1625 for Robert Innes and is the Premier Baronetcy of the Baronetage of Nova Scotia. The sixth Baronet succeeded as Duke of Roxburgh in 1812. For further history of the baronetcy, see that title.

The Innes Baronetcy, of Balvenie in the County of Banff, was created in the Baronetage of Nova Scotia on 15 January 1628 for Robert Innes, with remainder to heirs male whatsoever. The line of the first Baronet failed on the death of the eighth Baronet in 1817. The late Baronet was succeeded by his distant relative, the ninth Baronet, heir male of John Innes, great-great-uncle of the first Baronet. The twelfth Baronet served as Vice-Lord-Lieutenant of Banffshire. Victoria Cross recipient Lieutenant-General James John McLeod Innes was also a member of this family. The family surname is pronounced "Innis".

The Innes Baronetcy, of Coxton in the County of Moray, was created in the Baronetage of Nova Scotia on 20 March 1686 for Alexander Innes, Member of the Scottish Parliament for Moray, with remainder to heirs male whatsoever. He was a descendant of John Innes of Coxton, grandson of Patrick Innes, great-great-great-uncle of the first Baronet of Balvenie (see above). The line of the first Baronet failed on the death of his great-grandson, the sixth Baronet, in 1803. The seventh Baronet was the great-grandson of John Innes, younger brother of the first Baronet. This line of the family failed on the death of the eighth Baronet in 1886. The claim passed to Charles Innes, de jure ninth Baronet, a descendant of John Innes, great-uncle of the first Baronet. The eleventh Baronet proved his succession in 1973 and was placed on the Official Roll of the Baronetage.

The Innes Baronetcy, of Lochalsh in the County of Ross, was created in the Baronetage of the United Kingdom on 28 April 1819 for Hugh Innes, Member of Parliament for Tain Burghs. He never married and the title became extinct on his death in 1831.

Innes, later Innes-Ker baronets, of Innes (1625)
Sir Robert Innes, 1st Baronet (died )
Sir Robert Innes, 2nd Baronet (c. 1690)
Sir James Innes, 3rd Baronet (c. 1700)
Sir Harry Innes, 4th Baronet (c. 1670–1721)
Sir Harry Innes, 5th Baronet (died 1762)
Sir James Innes-Ker, 6th Baronet (1736–1823) (succeeded as 5th Duke of Roxburghe in 1812)
see Duke of Roxburghe for further succession

Innes baronets, of Balvenie (1628)

Sir Robert Innes, 1st Baronet (died c. 1650
Sir Walter Innes, 2nd Baronet (died c. 1670)
Sir Robert Innes, 3rd Baronet (died c. 1680)
Sir George Innes, 4th Baronet (died c. 1690)
Sir James Innes, 5th Baronet (died 1722)
Sir Robert Innes, 6th Baronet (c. 1703–1758)
Sir Charles Innes, 7th Baronet (c. 1704–1768)
Sir William Innes, 8th Baronet (died 1817)
Sir John Innes, 9th Baronet (1757–1829)
Sir John Innes, 10th Baronet (1801–1838)
Sir James Milne Innes, 11th Baronet (1808–1878)
Sir John Innes, 12th Baronet (1840–1912)
Sir James Innes, 13th Baronet (1846–1919)
Sir James Bourchier Innes, 14th Baronet (1883–1950)
Sir Walter James Innes, 15th Baronet (1903–1978)
Sir (Ronald Gordon) Berowald Innes, 16th Baronet (1907–1988)
Sir Peter Alexander Berowald Innes, 17th Baronet (born 1937)

Innes baronets, of Coxton (1686)
Sir Alexander Innes, 1st Baronet (c. 1652-d. by 1715)
Sir George Innes, 2nd Baronet (died c. December 1715)
Sir Alexander Barclay-Innes, 3rd Baronet (c. 1715-died by 1790)
Sir James Innes, 4th Baronet (died 1790)
Sir David Innes, 5th Baronet (died 1803)
Sir Alexander Innes, 6th Baronet (died 1811)
Sir David Innes, 7th Baronet (1781–1866)
Sir George Innes, 8th Baronet (1834–1886) (dormant)
Sir Charles Innes, de jure 9th Baronet (1825–1907)
Sir Charles Gordon Deverell Innes, de jure 10th Baronet (1870–1953)
Sir Charles Kenneth Gordon Innes, 11th Baronet (1910–1990) (claim allowed 1973)
Sir David Charles Kenneth Gordon Innes, 12th Baronet (1940–2010)
Sir Alastair Charles Deverell Innes, 13th Baronet (born 1970)

Innes baronets, of Lochalsh (1819)

Sir Hugh Innes, 1st Baronet (c. 1764–1831)

References

Kidd, Charles, Williamson, David (editors). Debrett's Peerage and Baronetage (1990 edition). New York: St Martin's Press, 1990, 

Baronetcies in the Baronetage of Nova Scotia
Extinct baronetcies in the Baronetage of the United Kingdom
1625 establishments in Nova Scotia
1819 establishments in the United Kingdom